"Toy Boy" is a song by American-British singer Sinitta, and was her first collaboration with producers Stock Aitken Waterman. The song was released on 25 July 1987, and became the fourth single in her self-titled debut album, which came out on 26 December of the same year. The lyrics were inspired by a tabloid newspaper article about the singer's love life, and she wrote the rap. The track reached number four in the UK in August 1987, staying on the charts for 14 weeks. The song was the 26th best-selling single of 1987 in the UK, selling more than some number ones from that year. It was certified silver by the BPI. It was also well-received on the US dance charts, peaking at number 19.

Critical reception
Max Bell from Number One complimented the song's "clever wordplay".

Formats and track listings
 7" 1 single
"Toy Boy" - 3:25
"Toy Boy" (Instrumental) - 4:56

 7" 2 single
"Toy Boy" - 3:25
"Toy Boy" (Extended Rap Version) - 3:50

 12" single
"Toy Boy" (The Extended Bicep Mix) - 7:36
"Toy Boy" - 3:25
"Toy Boy" (Instrumental) - 4:56

 US 12" single
"Toy Boy" (The Extended Bicep Mix) - 7:36
"Toy Boy" (The Extended British Mix) - 7:00

Charts

Weekly charts

Year-end charts

References

1987 singles
Song recordings produced by Stock Aitken Waterman
Sinitta songs
Songs written by Mike Stock (musician)
Songs written by Matt Aitken
Songs written by Pete Waterman
1987 songs
Fanfare Records singles